The Yachi River Bridge is a cable-stayed bridge in Guizhou, China.

The bridge crosses the Yachi River between Qianxi County in Bijie and Qingzhen in the city of Guiyang along the Qianxi Expressway.

References

See also
List of highest bridges
List of longest cable-stayed bridge spans
List of tallest bridges

Bridges in Guizhou
Suspension bridges in China
Bridges completed in 2016